Eriez Speedway located in Erie, Pennsylvania, United States is a 3/8 mile dirt oval race track. On July 22, 2007, Eriez Speedway held its first World of Outlaws Late Model Series event which was won by Josh Richards.

See also
 Bedford Speedway
 Lake Erie Speedway, Erie County, south of North East, Pennsylvania
 Nazareth Speedway
 Pocono Raceway

External links
Official Website

Stock car racing